The NST BS 650 is a German aircraft engine that was designed and produced by NST-Machinenbau of Niedergörsdorf for use in ultralight aircraft.

By March 2018 the engine was no longer advertised on the company website and seems to be out of production.

Design and development
The BS 650 is a twin-cylinder four-stroke, Vee configuration,  displacement, air-cooled, gasoline engine design, with a poly V belt reduction drive with a reduction ratio of 2.7:1. It employs dual magnetos and produces  at 4200 rpm, with a compression ratio of 9.0:1.

Specifications (BS 650)

See also

References

NST aircraft engines
Air-cooled aircraft piston engines
2010s aircraft piston engines